The Minister for Metropolitan Roads is a minister in the Government of New South Wales who has responsibilities for the development of road infrastructure and road pricing, and taxi and hire car policy and regulation in the metropolitan parts of the state.

In the second Perrottet ministry since December 2021 it is one of six ministries in the transport sector and the Minister, presently Natalie Ward, works with the Minister for Transport, the Minister for Regional Transport and Roads, the Minister for Infrastructure, the Minister for Cities and the Minister for Active Transport. Together they administer the portfolio through the Department of Transport (Transport for NSW) and a range of other government agencies that coordinate funding arrangements for transport operators, including hundreds of local and community transport operators.

List of ministers

Metropolitan roads
The following individuals have been appointed as Ministers for Metropolitan Roads, or any precedent title.

Former ministerial titles

Roads

See also 

List of New South Wales government agencies

References

Metropolitan Roads